The second All-Africa Games were held in Lagos, Nigeria in January 1973.

Ten new events were added, three for the men, 10,000 metres, marathon and hammer throw and seven for the women, 200 metres, 400 metres, 800 metres, 1500 metres, shot put, discus throw and 4 × 400 metres relay. Also the women's hurdles were changed from the 80 metre hurdles to the 100 metre hurdles as had happened across the world.

Five nations won medals for the first time these being Somalia, Algeria, Gambia, Togo and Swaziland while both Egypt and PR Congo won medals under new names.

Only one athlete defended his title from the 1965 Games, namely Malian discus thrower Namakoro Niaré. Four track and field athletes, two male and two female, won more than one event:

Ohene Karikari, Ghana (100 metres and 200 metres men)
Alice Annum, Ghana (100 metres and 200 metres women)
Modupe Oshikoya, Nigeria (high jump, long jump and 100m hurdles)
Ben Jipcho, Kenya (5000 metres and steeplechase)

Several women's events was added. These were 200 metres, 400 metres, 800 metres, 1500 metres, discus throw, shot put and 4 × 400 metres relay.

Nagui Asaad won his first Gold medal in Shot Put of the All Africa Games, 1973, Nigeria, and then he went to win a second time in 1978, All-Africa Games Algeria, He also was the Silver medallist in Discus throw of the All Africa Games, 1973

Medal summary

Men's events

Women's events

Medal table

References 

GBR Athletics

1973
All-Africa Games
Athletics
1973 All-Africa Games
1973 in Nigerian sport